Calypso Cliffs are two prominent rocky cliffs rising to  on the south side of Mobiloil Inlet immediately west of the mouth of Cronus Glacier, on the east coast of the Antarctic Peninsula. They were photographed from the air by the United States Antarctic Service, September 28, 1940, and by the Ronne Antarctic Research Expedition (trimetrogon air photography), December 22, 1947. They were surveyed by the Falkland Islands Dependencies Survey in December 1958, and named by the UK Antarctic Place-Names Committee after Calypso the daughter of Atlas, a goddess in Greek mythology.

References
 

Cliffs of Graham Land
Bowman Coast
Calypso (mythology)